The 1871 County Limerick by-election was fought on 28 January 1871.  The byelection was fought due to the incumbent Liberal MP William Monsell, becoming Postmaster General.  It was retained unopposed by William Monsell.

References

1871 elections in the United Kingdom
January 1871 events
By-elections to the Parliament of the United Kingdom in County Limerick constituencies
Unopposed ministerial by-elections to the Parliament of the United Kingdom (need citation)
1871 elections in Ireland